Nelson Lane Peterson (September 22, 1913 – December 4, 1990) was an American football running back in the National Football League for the Washington Redskins and the Cleveland Rams.  He attended West Virginia Wesleyan College.

References

External links

People from Greater Los Angeles
American football running backs
Washington Redskins players
Cleveland Rams players
West Virginia Wesleyan Bobcats football players
1913 births
1990 deaths
Columbus Bullies players
St. Louis Gunners players
People from Weston, West Virginia
Players of American football from West Virginia